Eumicrotremus gyrinops, known as the Alaskan lumpsucker, is a species of lumpfish native to the Bering Sea and the Aleutian Islands.

References 

gyrinops
Fish of the Bering Sea
Fish described in 1892